Swami Sumedhanand Saraswati (born 1 October 1951) is an Indian politician who has been a Member of Lok Sabha for Sikar since 2014. He belongs to Bharatiya Janata Party and is a member of Arya Samaj.

Early life
Saraswati was born on 1 October 1951 in a Jat family to Maya Ram Arya and Bharti Devi at Rohtak, Punjab (presently Haryana). He received a postgraduation degree from Chaudhary Charan Singh University in Sanskrit.

Spiritual career
Saraswati left home in c. 1974 and joined Arya Samaj. Saraswati is a sadhu (Hindu monk) and has also founded one vedic ashram. He is a former working president of Saarva Deshik Arya Pratinidhi Sabha, a Delhi based organization affiliated with Arya Samaj. Before entering politics, he has organised campaigns for cow protection and education of cultural tradition and Vedas.

Political career
Ahead of the 2014 Indian general election, the Bharatiya Janata Party announced that on the demand of Baba Ramdev, Saraswati would contest from Sikar constituency. However, local party leaders protested as they considered him to be an outsider as he hailed from Haryana. His convoy was also attacked. In the election, he was pitted against Subhash Maharia, an independent candidate and rebel of his party. On 16 May 2014, he was elected to the Lok Sabha after defeating his nearest rival Pratap Singh Jat of Indian National Congress party by a margin of approximately 239,000 votes.
In his election affidavit, Saraswati declared assets worth , the least amongst other parliamentarians.

During his tenure as an MP, Saraswati spent  240 million ( 3,428,522) from his Members of Parliament Local Area Development Scheme fund for his constituency. He also raised an issue about onion cultivation in Lok Sabha.

See also

 Arya Samajis
 Hindu reformists

References

1951 births
Living people
People from Rohtak district
Arya Samajis
Bharatiya Janata Party politicians from Rajasthan
India MPs 2014–2019
India MPs 2019–present
Lok Sabha members from Rajasthan
Chaudhary Charan Singh University alumni